Skaistkalne Manor, also called Šēnberga Manor, is a manor house in the historical region of Zemgale, in Latvia. It is located in the village of Skaistkalne near the Mēmele River on the border of Latvia and Lithuania.

History
Skaistkalne economic center has historically been a manor. The manor complex still has a manor house, a barn, a magazine, a water mill on the banks of the Mēmele River and a stone bridge.
The first owner of Skaistkalne Manor in 1489 was Heinrich Schoenberg, who was granted estate by the master of the Livonian Order Freitag-Loringhofen. The name of the manor originated from the first name of the owner and later became Latvian. Around 1650 the manor was bought by Johann von Berg-Carmel, who in 1658 initiated the construction of a Catholic church. In 1738 Skaistkalne manor was bought by Nikolaus von Korff, the owner of Priekule and Asīte manors and Brukna Manor, which is located about 20 kilometers from Skaistkalne. The manor remained in possession of Korff noble family until the Latvian Agrarian Reform in 1920s. 

The building was erected between 1893 and 1894, according to the project of Liepaja architect Max Paul Berchi. It was converted into a primary school in the 1920s, and now houses the Skaistkalne secondary school.
A luxurious fireplace and fragments of decorative elements have survived.

See also
List of palaces and manor houses in Latvia

References

Manor houses in Latvia